The following are the winners of the 37th annual (2010) Origins Award, presented at Origins 2011:

Hall of Fame
 Alex Randolph
 TwixT
 Erick Wujcik
 Amber Diceless Roleplaying
 Sid Sackson
 Acquire

External links
 2010 Origins Awards Winners and Nominees

2010 awards
 
2010 awards in the United States